Bogdinac is a village in the municipality of Sokobanja, Serbia. According to the 2002 census, the village has a population of 201 people.

References

Populated places in Zaječar District